Maarten Peijnenburg (born 10 January 1997) is a Dutch professional football player who plays for FC Eindhoven.

Club career
He made his professional debut in the Eerste Divisie for Jong PSV on 20 March 2015 in a game against SC Telstar.< He came on as a substitute for Clint Leemans after 77 minutes. Jong PSV drew 1–1 at Telstar Stadium. Augustine Loof scored the equaliser after 64 minutes, after Jonathan Kindermans had scored the opening goal.

In the summer of 2016, Peijnenburg left for FC Utrecht as a free agent. He made his debut for the second team Jong FC Utrecht in the 4–1 away loss to NAC Breda. He was replaced at the break by Odysseus Velanas. On 20 March 2018, FC Utrecht announced that his expiring contract would not be extended. His contract included a unilateral option for an extra season, but the club decided not to exercise this option. That meant that Peijnenburg had to look for a new club. He eventually signed a one-year contract with an option for an extra year with FC Dordrecht.

On 1 July 2019, Peijnenburg signed a two-year contract with FC Eindhoven.

References

External links
 
 Career stats & Profile - Voetbal International

1997 births
People from Boxtel
Living people
Dutch footballers
Eerste Divisie players
Jong PSV players
Jong FC Utrecht players
FC Dordrecht players
FC Eindhoven players
Association football defenders
Footballers from North Brabant